Olena Borysenko (born 4 June 1996 in Kreminna, Ukraine) is a Ukrainian athlete who competes in compound archery. She started archery in 2013 and first competed for the Ukrainian national team in 2014. She is righthanded. Her draw weight is 52 lbs. As well as competing internationally in archery, she is a student. Her hobbys are singing and sociology.

She is the member of the Ukrainian women's team that won the first ever medal in compound archery and the first ever gold medal overall for Ukraine at World Archery Championships in 2015.

References

1996 births
Living people
Ukrainian female archers
World Archery Championships medalists
Sportspeople from Luhansk Oblast
21st-century Ukrainian women